Raymond Clark (November 16, 1924 in Louisville, Kentucky – December 1, 1990) was an American sprint canoer who competed in the late 1940s. At the 1948 Summer Olympics in London, he finished 13th in the K-2 10000 m event while being eliminated in the heats of the K-2 1000 m event.

References
Raymond Clark's profile at Sports Reference.com

1924 births
1990 deaths
Sportspeople from Louisville, Kentucky
American male canoeists
Canoeists at the 1948 Summer Olympics
Olympic canoeists of the United States